Nokia 130 and Nokia 130 Dual Sim are Nokia-branded entry-level feature phones from HMD Global. Originally introduced September 2014 by Microsoft Mobile, the 130 supports one Mini-SIM card and 130 Dual Sim supports two Mini-SIM cards.  The cost will be equivalent of 19 Euros when bought unlocked and SIM-free. Its available colors are red, black, and white, depending on region and market.

The phones are targeted at emerging markets, and initially went on sale in China, Egypt, India, Indonesia, Kenya, Nigeria, Pakistan, Philippines, and Vietnam.

In 2017 a new version of the Nokia 130 was released under the same name (see Nokia 130 (2017)). It is slightly larger (111.5 x 48.4 x 14.2 mm), has small optical design changes and features a built-in flashlight and camera.

Specifications 
Nokia 130 runs on an updated Series 30+ UI. The phone comes pre-loaded with various apps, the Snake Xenzia game, and audio/video playback support. The audio player supports MP3, WAV, AAC files.  The video player supports MP4 (H.263) files.

The Nokia 130 and 130 Dual both provide the user with very long use times:

 Standby time up to 864 hours (36 days) for Nokia 130, and 624 hours (26 days) for Nokia 130 Dual Sim
 Talk time up to 13 hours (0.54 days)
 Video playback time up to 16 hours (0.67 days)
 Music playback time up to 46 hours (1.92 days)

See also 
 Nokia 3-digit series
 Nokia 100
 Nokia 101 (2011)
 Nokia 103
 Nokia 106

References

External links 
Official
 Nokia 130, nokia.com
 Nokia 130 Dual, nokia.com
Other
 Nokia 130, gsmarena.com
 Nokia 130 Dual, youtube.com
 What is Nokia Bluetooth SLAM and how do you use it?

130
Nokia 130
Mobile phones introduced in 2014
Mobile phones with user-replaceable battery